David ben Amram Adani (14th-century CE) was a Yemenite Jewish scholar renowned for his authorship of Midrash HaGadol, a collection of homiletical expositions drawn from ancient rabbinic sources. Adani is believed to have descended from a line of prominent Jewish leaders in Aden, as he is referred to in one ancient source as "David b. Amram, the nagid from the city of Aden." Nagid is a title borne by the leader of the Jewish community of Aden from the 12th century.

Life
Little is known of Adani's life, except that he was a gifted poet. All that which remains of his poetry, however, are the rhymed Hebrew poems which he penned at the introduction to each biblical parashah in the Midrash HaGadol, and one poem written for the liturgies cited on the Day of Atonement, entitled Naḍid er-Raḥamīm, in Judeo-Arabic. Other poems of his which have survived are a poetic introduction to the Jewish laws of ritual slaughter (Shechita) and a poem in Aramaic signed with his acrostics.

In his capacity as community leader, he had access to rare books of Jewish literature and oral traditions, of which he frequently cites in his Midrash HaGadol. Adani's Midrash HaGadol is the most disseminated of all midrashic literature found in Yemen, all of which being hand-made copies of Adani's work, written before the introduction of the printing press in Yemen. Many of these works are now housed in the manuscript department of major libraries in New York, London and Berlin.

Correspondence with Egypt's chief rabbi
In 1346, the head of Egypt's Jewish community, Yehoshua Hanagid, carried on a correspondence with Rabbi David Adani, in which the spiritual ruler of Egypt's Jewish community answered a number of questions sent to him ( = responsa) by the community in Yemen, mostly on matters relating to what seemed to be contradictions between two halakhic rulings in Maimonides' Mishne Torah and his Sefer ha-Mitzvot, although other questions simply relate, not to Maimonides, but to one of the other rabbinic sources, such as the words of the Sifra, in affirmative command no. 89. Some of the questions deal with practical halakha, such as those issues addressed in Seder Ahavah and Zemanim of Maimonides' Mishne Torah, as well as on the laws affecting women and marriages. In one question, David Adani requests of the Nagid in Egypt to arrange for the people of Yemen the set-order or cycle of nineteen calendar years, according to the Hebrew calendar, with their intercalated months, beginning with the year 1,663 of the Seleucid era (1352 CE). More than one-hundred questions and responsa were exchanged between the two men.

Poetry
The rhymed poetic openings used by David Adani at the start of each parashah in the Midrash HaGadol are reminiscent of Rabbi Hai ben Nahshon Gaon's midrash Pitheron Torah (Torah Solution), a work thought to have been compiled about 886–896 CE. Their primary intent is to grace the midrashic works under discussion.

References

Notes

Bibliography

Further reading

14th-century Jews
14th-century rabbis
14th-century writers
Yemenite rabbis
Yemenite Jews
Yemenite Orthodox rabbis
Jewish Yemeni history
Jews and Judaism in Yemen